The Firm Gets Married may refer to:

 The Firm Gets Married, a 1914 German silent comedy film
 The Firm Gets Married, a 1931 German musical comedy film